We Were Here is the sixth studio album by Turin Brakes and second released on 30 September 2013 through Cooking Vinyl. It was recorded at Rockfield Studios and engineered and mixed by Ali Staton and produced by Turin Brakes and Ali Staton. It was released on 30 September 2013.

Track listing

Charts

References

2013 albums
Turin Brakes albums